HTTP Parameter Pollution (HPP) is a web application vulnerability exploited by injecting encoded query string delimiters in already existing parameters. The vulnerability occurs if user input is not correctly encoded for output by a web application. This vulnerability allows the injection of parameters into web application-created URLs. It was first brought forth to the public in 2009 by Stefano di Paola and Luca Carettoni, in the conference OWASP EU09 Poland. The impact of such vulnerability varies, and it can range from "simple annoyance" to complete disruption of the intended behavior of a web application. Overriding HTTP parameters to alter a web application's behavior, bypassing input and access validation checkpoints, as well as other indirect vulnerabilities, are possible consequences of a HPP attack.

There is no RFC standard on what should be done when it has passed multiple parameters. HPP could be used for cross channel pollution, bypassing CSRF protection and WAF input validation checks.

Behaviour
When it has passed multiple parameters with the same name, here is how the backend behaves.

Types

Client-side
 First Order / Reflected HPP
 Second Order / Stored HPP
 Third Order / DOM HPP

Server-side
 Standard HPP
 Second Order HPP

Prevention
Proper input validation and awareness about web technology on HPP is protection against HTTP Parameter Pollution.

See also
HTTP response splitting
HTTP request smuggling

References 

Hypertext Transfer Protocol
Internet security
Computer security exploits

Bibliography